The Push Stars are an American rock band, formed in Cambridge, Massachusetts in 1996.  The band members include Chris Trapper, Ryan MacMillan and Dan McLoughlin. They developed a following playing shows in Boston, then released their first album, "Meet Me at the Fair" in 1996. Since then, they have released four more studio albums, as well as a live compilation album, and have had several of their songs featured in television, film, and soundtracks. While on hiatus, frontman Chris Trapper has recorded and toured as a solo artist and Ryan MacMillan has played drums with Matchbox Twenty. In 2017, the Push Stars played some reunion shows and announced the recording of a new album which was fully funded via kickstarter. In July, 2017, recording of the new album commenced at Ardent Studios in Memphis, TN. On September 21, 2018, the band released their latest recording, "3 Feet in the Air."

Discography
 Meet Me at the Fair (1996, Imago)
 Tonight (EP,  1998)
 After The Party (1999, Capitol)
 Opening Time (2001, Co-Op Pop)
 Paint the Town (2004, 33rd Street Records)
 3 Feet In The Air (2018, Starlit Records)

Film
 Origin of the Species (1998), produced by David Nickoll (Saturday Night Live, Boogie Nights)
 There’s Something About Mary (1998), starring Cameron Diaz, Ben Stiller and Matt Dillon.
 Gun Shy (2000), starring Sandra Bullock and Liam Neeson.
 Me, Myself & Irene (2000), starring Jim Carrey and Renée Zellweger.
The Push Stars’ "Well Anyway" and "Me" licensed for the independent film Dinner and a Movie (2000).
 Say It Isn't So (2001), starring Heather Graham and Chris Klein.
 Almost Perfect (2011), starring Kelly Hu and Roger Rees.

Trivia
They toured with Matchbox Twenty in 2003. According to Rob Thomas, Matchbox Twenty performed most of the tracks from their album More Than You Think You Are on this tour, except for fan-favorite "The Difference". Apparently tired of hearing requests for the song, The Push Stars actually played the song on one occasion themselves.

References

External links
Official Site
Official Myspace Page

Rock music groups from Massachusetts
Musical groups from Cambridge, Massachusetts
Musical groups established in 1996